Shane Bourke (born 9 November 1988) is an Irish sportsperson. He plays hurling with his local club J.K. Bracken's and with the Tipperary senior inter-county team.

Career
Bourke won an All-Ireland Minor Hurling medal with Tipperary in 2006, and played Under 21 Hurling with Tipperary in 2008 and 2009, winning a Munster Under 21 winners medal in 2008.

He made his senior Tipperary debut in the fourth round of the league on 13 March 2011 against Offaly in a 1-20 to 0-10 win, coming on in the fifth minute as a substitute for the injured Eoin Kelly and scoring three points.

He made his first start on 27 March 2011 in the fifth round of the league against Cork in a 1-14 to 1-14 draw at Páirc Uí Chaoimh.
On 3 April 2011 in the sixth round of the league against Galway at Pearse Stadium, Bourke scored 3-4 from play as Tipperary defeated Galway by 4-23 to 1-14.

Honours

Tipperary

Munster Senior Hurling Championship (3)
 2011, 2012, 2015
All-Ireland Minor Hurling Championship (1)
 2006
Munster Under-21 Hurling Championship (1)
 2008

University College Cork
Fitzgibbon Cup (1)
 2009 (c)

References

External links
 Tipperary GAA Player Profiles

Living people
Tipperary inter-county hurlers
J.K. Bracken's hurlers
1988 births